Umboi (also named Rooke or Siassi) is a volcanic island between the mainland of Papua New Guinea and the island of New Britain. It is separated from New Britain by the Dampier Strait and Huon Peninsula, and New Guinea by the Vitiaz Strait.

Languages are Papuan Kobai; and Austronesian: Mbula, Karanai, and Saveng languages.

The Siassi Archipelago lies off the southeast coast of Umboi Island (a total of 18 islands, only seven are inhabited). 
During the mid-1920s, the population of the Siassi Islands was a little over 700 people. It had more than doubled (to almost 1700 people) by the early 1960s, and then decreased to a little more than 1600 people by the early 1980s. The Siassi support themselves through traditional trade based on a barter system; they are important middlemen who deliver pigs, pots and wooden bowls by sea in their canoes.

See also
 List of volcanoes in Papua New Guinea
 Siassi Rural LLG

References 

 

Islands of Papua New Guinea
Volcanoes of Papua New Guinea
Subduction volcanoes
Complex volcanoes
Morobe Province